The Human Footprint is an ecological footprint map of human influence on the terrestrial systems of the Earth. It was first published in a 2002 article by Eric W. Sanderson, Malanding Jaiteh, Marc A. Levy, Kent H. Redford, Antoinette V. Wannebo, and Gillian Woolmer. A map of human influence became possible with the advent of high-resolution satellite imagery in the 1990s.

Method
In order to compare the effect of influence from different factors, the magnitude of influence for each factor was ranked on a scale of 0–10. These eight factors measure four types of data, which are cumulatively used as a measure of human influence: population density, land transformation, accessibility, and electrical power infrastructure. The first Human Footprint map was published in 2002 with data that had been collected in the early 1990s, approximately 1993. In 2016, an updated map was published using the same methodology, using data from 2009.

Due to incomplete satellite imagery, the original Human Footprint map did not include Antarctica nor some of the Small Island Developing States of the Pacific Ocean. Marine and freshwater systems are excluded, as different factors would be necessary to map human influence.

Change over time
The Human Footprint increased by 9% from 1993 to 2009, at least partly attributable to a human population increase of 23% and a global economy increase of 153% during the same period. Though population and economic growth far exceed the growth of the Human Footprint, the areas that saw increased human influence were those with the highest biodiversity.

See also
 Carbon footprint: the total greenhouse gas (GHG) emissions caused by an individual, event, organization, service, or product, expressed as carbon dioxide equivalent
 Last of the Wild: a complementary global map produced in the same 2002 study that shows the wildest remaining areas of each biome

References

Environmental indices
Maps
Environmental impact assessment
Wildlife Conservation Society